Maria Kyridou (born 26 April 2001) is a Greek rower from Thessaloniki. Along with Christina Bourmpou, she won four gold medals for Greece in just over four months. The last one, was the gold medal at the 2018 Summer Youth Olympics. Kyridou participated – along with Bourmpou – at the 2020 Olympics, reaching the final and eventually taking the fifth place.

She is the sister of Anneta Kyridou. She attends The Ohio State University.

References

Living people
2001 births
Rowers at the 2018 Summer Youth Olympics
Greek female rowers
Youth Olympic gold medalists for Greece
Rowers at the 2020 Summer Olympics
Rowers from Thessaloniki